Borai is a census town in Singur CD Block in Chandannagore subdivision of Hooghly district in the Indian state of West Bengal.

Geography

Location

The area is composed of flat alluvial plains that form a part of the Gangetic Delta.

Urbanisation
In Chandannagore subdivision 58.52% of the population is rural and the urban population is 41.48%. Chandannagore subdivision has 1 municipal corporation, 3 municipalities and 7 census towns. The single municipal corporation is Chandernagore Municipal Corporation. The municipalities are Tarakeswar Municipality, Bhadreswar Municipality and Champdany Municipality. Of the three CD Blocks in Chandannagore subdivision, Tarakeswar CD Block is wholly rural, Haripal CD Block is predominantly rural with just 1 census town, and Singur CD Block is slightly less rural with 6 census towns. Polba Dadpur and Dhaniakhali CD Blocks of Chinsurah subdivision (included in the map alongside) are wholly rural. The municipal areas are industrialised. All places marked in the map are linked in the larger full screen map.

Demographics
As per 2011 Census of India Borai had a total population of 6,522 of which 3,321 (51%) were males and 3,201 (49%) were females. Population below 6 years was 570. The total number of literates in Borai was 5,010 (84.17% of the population over 6 years).

Dankuni Urban Agglomeration
As per the 2011 census, Dankuni Urban Agglomeration includes: Dankuni (M), Purba Tajpur (CT), Kharsarai (CT), Begampur (CT), Chikrand (CT), Pairagachha (CT), Barijhati (CT), Garalgachha (CT), Krishnapur (CT), Baruipara (CT), Borai (CT), Nawapara (CT), Basai (CT), Gangadharpur (CT),  Manirampur (CT), Janai (CT), Kapashanria (CT), Jaykrishnapur (CT), Tisa (CT), Baksa (CT), Panchghara (CT) and Naiti (CT).

Transport
There is 31 Number Private Bus from Jangipara bus stand to Serampore bus stand via Furfura Sharif, Sehakhala, Banmalipur, Gangadharpur, Baruipara, Borai and Milki Badamtala.

It is close to NH 19 (old numbering NH 2)/ Durgapur Expressway.

References

Cities and towns in Hooghly district